Lawrence Mysak,  (born January 1940) is a Canadian applied mathematician, working primarily on physical oceanography, and climate research, particularly arctic and palaeoclimate research.

Born in Saskatoon, Saskatchewan, Lawrence earned his B.Sc. in applied mathematics in 1961 from the University of Alberta (Canada) along with his Assoc. Mus. (flute performance), his M.Sc. from the University of Adelaide in 1963 (where he was supervised by George Szekeres ) and his Ph.D., also in applied mathematics, from Harvard University in 1967. Lawrence continues to play the flute now with the I Medici di McGill orchestra.

Then followed faculty appointments at Harvard University and the University of British Columbia where he co-authored the standard textbook on Waves in the Ocean with Paul LeBlond.  Finally he joined the faculty at McGill University from 1986 until his retirement in 2010.  At McGill University Mysak was the founding director, in 1990, of the McGill Centre for Global Change Research which is now known as the Global Environment and Climate Change Centre and during his tenure Dr. Mysak served as president of the International Association for the Physical Sciences of the Oceans, IAPSO and serves on the board of trustees of the Canadian Foundation for Climate and Atmospheric Sciences.

Mysak's research focuses on Arctic sea ice and climate during the Little Ice Age; sea ice rheology (viscous-plastic vs. purely plastic models); modeling the freshwater budget of the Arctic Ocean and exchanges with the North Atlantic Ocean (present and past); response of the ocean carbon cycle to Milankovitch forcing in a low-order atmosphere-ocean-sea ice model; and reconstruction of climate change in Europe during the past millennium from an analysis of church architecture, comparing the Medieval Warm Period with the Little Ice Age.

Lawrence Mysak has an Erdös Number of 2 List of people by Erdős number as a result of a paper he published with George Szekeres who has an Erdös Number of 1.

Honours
Fellow of the Royal Society of Canada
Lauréat Prix Acfas Michel-Jurdant, for environmental sciences, 2005
Member of the Order of Canada (CM)
Fellow of the Canadian Meteorological and Oceanographic Society (CMOS)
Fellow of the American Meteorological Society
Fellow of the American Geophysical Union (AGU)
Canadian Steamship Lines Professor of Meteorology at McGill University, Canada
Honorary professor of the National University of Kyiv-Mohyla Academy

References

External links
 Lawrence Mysak's homepage
 Order of Canada
 Canadian Meteorological and Oceanographic Society (CMOS)
 American Meteorological Society (AMetSoc)
 American Geophysical Union (AGU)
 International Association for the Physical Sciences of the Oceans (IAPSO)
 The Canadian Foundation for Climate and Atmospheric Sciences (CFCAS)
 Canadian Steamship Lines

1965 births
Living people
20th-century Canadian mathematicians
21st-century Canadian mathematicians
Fellows of the American Geophysical Union
Fellows of the Royal Society of Canada
Harvard School of Engineering and Applied Sciences alumni
Members of the Order of Canada
People from Saskatoon
University of Alberta alumni
University of Adelaide alumni
Fellows of the American Meteorological Society